Nicholas Michael O'Donnell (born 23 March 1993) is a Filipino footballer. He was called up to Philippines national football team in 2014.

Club career
O'Donnell used to play for Ateneo Blue Booters helping them win the football tournament of UAAP Season 75 in 2013. The next year he moved to Kaya F.C. He helped Kaya win the 2015 UFL Cup.

In 2016, O'Donnell moved to Global F.C.

International career

Philippines youth
On 20 March 2015, it was announced that O'Donnell was called up by the Philippines U-23 team for the 2016 AFC U-23 Championship qualification on March 25 to 31 in Thailand. He played in the Philippines last game as captain, a 3-1 defeat to Cambodia.

Philippines
O'Donnell was called up into the Philippine senior team for friendlies against Malaysia and Azerbaijan in 2014. He made his national team debut in a 3-0 win over Nepal. O'Donnell played for the Philippines again at the 2017 CTFA International Tournament in Taiwan under caretaker coach Marlon Maro who led the squad in lieu of Thomas Dooley.

O'Donnell played at the second half of the Philippines 3-2 win over Fiji as a substitute for Michael Falkesgaard at the 45th minute.

References

External links 
 

1993 births
Living people
Soccer players from Toronto
Citizens of the Philippines through descent
Canadian sportspeople of Filipino descent
Filipino footballers
Filipino people of Canadian descent
Filipino people of Irish descent
Association football goalkeepers
Ateneo de Manila University alumni
Kaya F.C. players
Philippines international footballers
Global Makati F.C. players
Davao Aguilas F.C. players